The plate lunch is a quintessentially Hawaiian meal, roughly analogous to Southern U.S. meat-and-threes. However, the pan-Asian influence on Hawaiian cuisine, and its roots in the Japanese bento, make the plate lunch unique to Hawaii.

Standard plate lunches consist of two scoops of white rice, macaroni salad, and an entrée. A plate lunch with more than one entrée is often called a mixed plate.

Origins 

Although the exact origin of the Hawaiian plate lunch is disputed, according to Professor Jon Okamura of the University of Hawaiʻi, the plate lunch likely grew out of the Japanese bento, because "bentos were take away kinds of eating and certainly the plate lunch continues that tradition". Its appearance in Hawaii in recognizable form goes back to the 1880s when plantation workers were in high demand by the fruit and sugar companies on the islands. Laborers were brought to Hawaii from around the world, including from China, Japan, Portugal, and the Philippines. Kaui Philpotts, former food editor of the Honolulu Advertiser, notes that the laborers "didn't eat sandwiches or things like that; it was leftover rice and a lot of things like canned meat or teriyaki or cold meat or maybe scrambled eggs or pickles, and almost no salad or vegetable." Later on, macaroni salad was added to the plates, as it seemed to bridge national tastes and also mixed well with gravy-covered slabs of meat. Some locations also include the traditional Korean side dish kimchi.

As the days of the plantations came to an end, plate lunches began to be served on-site by lunch wagons to construction workers and day laborers. Later, local hole-in-the-wall restaurants and other stand-alone plate lunch restaurants began popping up, then plate lunch franchises. Eventually, these made their way to the U.S. mainland such as the L&L Drive-Inn chain in California in 1999. L&L founder Eddie Flores rebranded it "L&L Hawaiian Barbecue", explaining that "When we went to the mainland, the name 'Hawaiian' is a draw, because everyone just fantasized, everyone wants to come to Hawaii."

Popular entrées 
Overwhelmingly, popular plate lunch entrées reflect Asian influence.  Of Japanese origin is chicken katsu (fried boneless chicken breaded with Japanese bread crumbs) and beef teriyaki ("teri beef"). A common side-dish with plate lunches is fried noodles, often chow mein, chow fun or saimin noodles.

Entrées of Hawaiian origin include kālua puaʻa (roast pork) and laulau (pork or other meat or fish wrapped in a taro leaf). Some side dishes are lomi-lomi salmon (salmon salad) and haupia (a coconut dessert).

Korean entrées include kalbi and meat jun. Some side dishes are taegu, a dish made of shredded codfish, and kongnamul muchim, a dish made of seasoned soybean sprouts.

Other Asian ethnic contributions include the Okinawan shoyu pork (Okinawan: rafute), Chinese-influenced char siu pork, and Filipino chicken adobo and longanisa.  Western European dishes include linguiça, a traditional Portuguese sausage.

A notably American element is the hamburger steak, a ground beef patty smothered with brown gravy served atop rice; adding a sunny side up egg makes it a Loco Moco.

See also

 Cuisine of Hawaii

References

External links
History of the Hawaiian Plate Lunch (New York Times, 2008)
Southern California Plate Lunch Connection
Origins of the plate lunch story from KHNL
"What's in a Hawaiian Plate Lunch?" (video)
Politics of the Plate Lunch, 1997 exhibition at the Japanese American National Museum

Food combinations
Hawaiian cuisine
Hawaiian fusion cuisine
Japanese fusion cuisine
Lunch dishes
Restaurant terminology
Serving and dining